Drew Nathan Porter (born 7 September 1985) is an Australian former cricketer.

The son of Graeme Porter, who played One Day International cricket for Australia, Porter was educated at Leeming Primary School and Kent Street Senior High School. He played cricket from an early age, representing Western Australia at schoolboy, Under-15, Under-17 and Under-19, and was named in the Australian Cricket Board's Under-17 development squad in 2003.

He played cricket in England in 2006, playing for Bashley (Rydal) in the Southern Premier League and Second XI matches for Hampshire.

Porter made his first-class debut for Western Australia against Queensland in January 2009, making 18 not out and taking one wicket. He has played three further first-class matches, as well as three List A and one Twenty20 match. He also plays grade cricket for Melville in the Western Australian Grade Cricket competition.

References

1985 births
Australian cricketers
People educated at Kent Street Senior High School
Western Australia cricketers
Living people
Cricketers from Perth, Western Australia